Satu Kiipeli (born 24 December 1980) is a Finnish ice hockey defenceman and coach, currently serving as assistant coach to Oulun Kärpät Akatemia in the Naisten Mestis. During her career with the Finnish national team, she represented Finland in the women's ice hockey tournament at the 2006 Winter Olympics in Turin and at the IIHF Women's World Championships in 2001 and 2005.

Playing career 
Kiipeli's senior career began in the 1994–95 season of the Naisten SM-sarja with Oulun Kärpät Naiset. She played six seasons in Finland with Kärpät before relocating to the United States in 2000 to play with the Minnesota Duluth Bulldogs women's ice hockey program in the Western Collegiate Hockey Association (WCHA) conference of the NCAA Division I. With the Bulldogs, she won the NCAA Women's Ice Hockey Championship in 2001, 2002, and 2003.  

Following graduation from the University of Minnesota Duluth in 2004, Kiipeli played the 2004–05 season with the Minnesota Whitecaps in the Western Women's Hockey League (WWHL). In 2005, she moved back to Finland to begin her master's studies at the University of Jyväskylä and returned to playing in the Naisten SM-sarja, this time as captain of the women's team of Itä-Helsingin Kiekko (IHK). During the 2006–07 season, she served as player-coach for IHK, capping the season with a Finnish Championship bronze medal win. 

In 2007, she left IHK to rejoin Oulun Kärpät and stayed with the team until her retirement from playing in 2015. With Kärpät she won the Aurora Borealis Cup in 2012 and a bronze medal in the 2013 IIHF European Women's Champions Cup.

Personal life 

See also 
 List of Olympic women's ice hockey players for Finland
 List of Finnish women in North American collegiate ice hockey

References

External links
 
 

1980 births
Living people
Finnish expatriate ice hockey players in the United States
Finnish ice hockey coaches
Finnish women's ice hockey defencemen
Ice hockey players at the 2006 Winter Olympics
Minnesota Duluth Bulldogs women's ice hockey players
Minnesota Whitecaps players
Olympic ice hockey players of Finland
Oulun Kärpät Naiset players
People from Raahe
Sportspeople from North Ostrobothnia